Salomaa is a Finnish surname. Notable people with the surname include:

Arto Salomaa, Finnish mathematician and computer scientist
Hiski Salomaa, Finnish-American folk singer
Jarno Salomaa, Finnish metal musician
Sonya Salomaa, Canadian Finnish actor

Finnish-language surnames